Abuhatzira is a surname. Notable people with the surname include:

Aharon Abuhatzira (1938-2021), Israeli politician
Shimon Abuhatzira (born 1986), Israeli footballer

Maghrebi Jewish surnames
Surnames of Moroccan origin